In Youth is Pleasure is the second published novel by the English writer and painter Denton Welch. It was first published in February 1945 by Routledge. It was also the last novel to be issued in his lifetime.

Background
The title comes from a poem by the sixteenth century English poet Robert Wever. As originally published, the dustjacket, endpapers and frontispiece were designed by Welch. The frontispiece bears a dedication to his late mother.

In Youth is Pleasure differs from Welch's other novels, and indeed most of his short stories, in that it is written in the third person. Set "several years" before World War II (identified as 1930 by Welch's biographer Michael De-la-Noy), it tells the story of a fifteen-year-old boy, Orvil Pym, who spends a summer holiday at a country hotel outside London with his widowed father and two older brothers. As with virtually everything Welch wrote, it is strongly autobiographical, leading several commentators to simply observe that Orvil is Denton Welch. As if to emphasise this, the places featured in the novel (the hotel, the dogs' cemetery, the grotto) are real. Welch's attachment to the place prevailed until the end of his life: writing in his journal a few months before his death, he lamented the demolition of the grotto ("the wickedly neglected, enchanted little corner!"), which had occurred some time before May 1948.

Summary
In common with its predecessor, Maiden Voyage, the novel is episodic in nature without any central plot. In many ways, Orvil himself is the 'plot', as the narrative revolves around his experiences, his reactions to them, and reveries about them.

In Chapter One Orvil's father collects him from school and they spend the night in Oxford, before heading to Salisbury Plain to collect his older brother Ben. In Chapter Two they arrive at the hotel where they meet Orvil's oldest brother Charles with whom he has an awkward relationship. He goes canoeing and spies on two boys who are camping with a man. He later hides in some bushes where he masturbates before being caught by an older man; later still he is jeered at by a picknicking group of young men. In Chapter Three he tries sweat therapy before dressing up in plus fours and goes out boating with his brothers. He then buys a little scent bottle and a Chinese armorial saucer in an antiques shop. In Chapter Four he borrows a bicycle and explores a church where he drinks some communion wine. He re-encounters the man he had seen earlier with the boys, who is a schoolmaster, and spends the afternoon with him in a scout hut. In Chapter Five he is charmed by a young woman called Aphra, one of Charles' friends, but at a party later sees Aphra and Charles having sex in a grotto near the hotel. Chapter Six describes Orvil's visit to the family of a schoolfriend in Hastings. In Chapter Seven he re-encounters the schoolmaster where he discloses his feelings about the loss of his mother. Finally in Chapter Eight he returns to school by train where he is bullied by an older boy before being rescued by Ben.

Critical response
As with Maiden Voyage, contemporary reviews were mixed, but perhaps overall less positive than the earlier work. Writing in The Saturday Review, Basil Davenport was repelled by the "soul-sick" Orvil as a person, but praised Welch's skill generally in drawing out "such labyrinthine regions of the human soul", comparing Orvil to the first-person protagonist of Welch's earlier short story "When I Was Thirteen". Conversely, in Horizon Anna Kavan found Orvil's emotional development to be in advance of his contemporaries, despite some "infantile sadism". Like Davenport, Kavan praised Welch's written style, as having "gaiety and verve". In The Spectator, Kate O'Brien, seeking "morality" or "conflict" in the story, found instead "undistinguished adventures in self-indulgence and self pity," adding that it made "somewhat uncomfortable reading in this tragic day." However four years later in the same journal, Jean Bailhache considered the work to be "personal but pulsating with life quite unadulterated, by which, of course, I mean free from any adult interposition." According to Welch's own journal, the novel "caused a sensation" in Lord Berners' household but he does not expand on what the nature of the "sensation" was.

In The New York Times, Marguerite Young was no more enamoured of the subject matter than many other reviewers, but drew parallels between Welch's impressionistic style and that of James Joyce and Virginia Woolf: "We see the hand and then the cherry-coloured fingernails — although we may never see the body. We always realise life only partially. Through a play with half-realised, unrelated details may come about a new understanding of our complex experience."

Of later criticism, in his 1974 assessment of Welch's writing, Robert Phillips subjects In Youth is Pleasure to a somewhat relentless Freudian analysis. Phillips also sees the Hastings chapter as a "digression", despite holding the commonly-agreed view of the novel essentially having no plot. Most surprisingly of all for a literary analysis, Phillips makes no mention of the source or meaning of the novel's title, despite Welch having inscribed a stanza of Wever's poem into part of the frontispiece design. Instead, he chooses to interpret the frontispiece dedication to Welch's mother as another scrap of evidence for the Oedipal nature of the novel.

In contrast to the almost exclusively psycho-sexual readings of In Youth is Pleasure, James Methuen-Campbell alone makes reference to the "deeply moving" episode in Chapter Seven where Orvil gives the schoolmaster an account of the last time he saw his mother. Touchingly, for Methuen-Campbell, this is complemented by the novel's dedication, which Welch makes to his mother in her maiden name. 

Summarising the essence of the novel, in his introduction to the 1985 reprint of In Youth is Pleasure, William S. Burroughs wrote:Denton Welch makes the reader aware of the magic that is right under his eyes, for most of the experiences he describes are of a commonplace variety: a walk, a tea, a peach melba, rain on a river, a visit to an antiques store, a picture on a biscuit tin, a bicycle ride, adolescent tears.

Notes and references

British autobiographical novels
1945 British novels
Novels set in England
Routledge books